Autocharis vohilavalis is a moth in the family Crambidae. It is found in Madagascar.

References

Moths described in 1956
Odontiinae
Moths of Madagascar